Dawg is 2002 dramedy film directed by Victoria Hochberg.  It stars Denis Leary and Elizabeth Hurley, in their second film together. Steffani Brass was nominated for Young Artist Award for her role in this film. Although intended to be released in theaters under the title Bad Boy, it was ultimately distributed direct-to-video.

Plot
Douglas "Dawg" Munford (Denis Leary) is the ultimate womanizer: he is selfish, rude and totally uncaring about what a woman thinks after they have sex. He arrives too late for his grandmother's funeral, but finds that she has left him a million dollars, subject to one condition.

As explained by estate executor Anna Lockhart (Elizabeth Hurley), Douglas must contact at least a dozen of the scores of women he has seduced and left during his lifetime and beg for their forgiveness. Reluctantly, Dawg sets out on his odyssey which takes him, and the lawyer, to venues throughout California. Later, he falls for Anna.

Cast
Denis Leary - Douglas "Dawg" Munford
Elizabeth Hurley - Anna Lockhart
Nicole Robinson - Megan Riley
Mia Cottet	- Kiana Mortenson
Julia Murphy - Holly
Elizabeth Rossa - Jill
Alice Amter - Donna
Annie Sorell - Sherri
Alicia Lorén - Stephanie
Vanessa Bell Calloway - Christine Hodges
Elaine Hendrix - Angel
Steffani Brass - Lindsay Anne Wickman
Jackie Tohn - Eric Koyle
Alex Borstein - Darcy Smits

External links

2002 films
American romantic comedy films
2002 romantic comedy films
Gold Circle Films films
2002 direct-to-video films
2000s English-language films
2000s American films